Lake Le Homme Dieu is a lake in Douglas County, in the U.S. state of Minnesota.

Lake Le Homme Dieu was named for a friend of Gleny King, an early settler. The name comes from french "L'homme de Dieu", meaning "The man of God".

See also
List of lakes in Minnesota

References

Lakes of Minnesota
Lakes of Douglas County, Minnesota